The 1992 ECO summit was the first Economic Cooperation Organization summit, held 16–17 February in Tehran, Iran. The summit welcomed the admission of new members Azerbaijan, Turkmenistan, Uzbekistan, Tajikistan and Kyrgyzstan as well as allowing limited participation in economic, cultural and technical activities of Northern Cyprus.

Attending delegations

References

External links

Diplomatic conferences in Iran
20th-century diplomatic conferences
1992 in Iran
1992 in international relations
1992 conferences
Economic Cooperation Organization summits
Tehran
20th century in Tehran